Uridine diphosphoglucose-cyanohydrin glucosyltransferase may refer to:

 Cyanohydrin beta-glucosyltransferase
 Hydroxymandelonitrile glucosyltransferase